Southern States Wrestling is an American independent professional wrestling promotion based in Kingsport, Tennessee. Founded by wrestler Beau James in early 1991, SSW (along with NWA Bluegrass) succeeded Smoky Mountain Wrestling as the top promotion in eastern Tennessee following its close. It featured a number of former SMW mainstays including Steve Flynn, Tracy Smothers, Killer Kyle, Tom Prichard, Bunkhouse Buck, Buddy Landell, The Mongolian Stomper and The Batten Twins (Bart & Brad Batten). While in the promotion, Ricky Morton teamed with longtime Fantastics rival Bobby Fulton as the Fantastic Express as well as forming a second incarnation of the Rock 'n' Roll Express with Ricky Harrison capturing the promotion's tag team title with both men.

Others to appear in the promotion have included former National Wrestling Alliance veterans Ivan Koloff, Jimmy Valiant, Junkyard Dog, Pez Whatley, Terry Taylor, Shane Douglas and female wrestlers Sherri Martel, Debbie Combs, Brandi Alexander, Lexie Fyfe and Malia Hosaka. Jillian Hall, E. Z. Money, Joey Corman and Samir and Andy Douglas. The promotion also runs a wrestling school in Fall Branch, Tennessee.

In 2015, Beau James began cutting back SSW's schedule due to his commitments to Appalachian Mountain Wrestling as manager of The Progressive Liberal, however, the promotion continues to hold events at county fairs and high school gyms.

History
Southern States Wrestling was founded by Beau James, who began promoting wrestling events in Kingsport and Fall Branch, Tennessee. The promotion crowned its first heavyweight champion when The Tennessee Equalizer defeated George Hiatt in Elizabethton, Tennessee on February 16, 1991. A junior heavyweight title was created the following year when Eddie Golden defeated Jamie Gibson in Banner Elk, North Carolina. In 1995 the promotion expanded by creating two more titles. The junior heavyweight title was abandoned the previous year and replaced by the SSW Appalachian Heavyweight Championship won by Eddie Golden when he beat Tracy Smothers in a best-of-three series in Meadowview, Virginia on May 11, 1996. Four years later, Mike Cooper won the SSW Young Guns Television Championship in Kingsport coinciding with the promotion launching its weekly television program which aired regularly on WAPK-CA from January 1999 until October 2003. The promotion eventually released a series of dvds from the program, most notably, Superstars and Legends, Vol. 1, which featured Don Wright, Ivan Koloff, The Equalizer, Jimmy Valiant, Wahoo McDaniel, Killer Kyle, Jimmy Valiant and Stan Lee. On May 10, 2001, the promotion held the Mark Curtis Memorial Weekend of Champions in Kingsport, Tennessee in honor of World Championship Wrestling referee Mark Curtis with the proceeds donated to the Children's Miracle Network. Among those headlining the event included Arn Anderson. The next year, the Mark Curtis Memorial Weekend of Champions and Legends Reunion featured Jimmy Valiant, Ivan Koloff and Sandy Scott. Family members of the late Whitey Caldwell were also in attendance. Southern States Wrestling became involved with AWA Superstars of Wrestling during the early-2000s, although not an official affiliate promotion, and has held interpromotional events with its sister promotion Tennessee's Championship Wrestling. In April 2005, Beau James, Tom Prichard and The Super Destroyer faced Championship Wrestling's "Adorable" Danny Ray, Nick Hammonds & Wayne Adkins at the Night of Grudges supercard at the National Guard Armory in Kingsport. This was the first interpromotional event in which both promotion's champions faced each other. In November 2006, Beau James married female wrestler Misty James at the 15th annual supercard Thanksgiving Night Spectacular at the Kingsport National Guard Armory. Both would participate in mixed tag team matches during the next year. In early 2008, he and his wife were involved in a major interpromotional feud with AWA Superstars of Wrestling World Heavyweight Champion Brian Logan.

Southern States Wrestling Network
In August 2017, Beau James announced that SSW had signed a deal with a VOD service to provide online streaming platform for the promotion. It took nearly a year to transfer the entire SSW Video Library from VHS/DVD to a digital format. The Southern States Wrestling Network made its debut on July 15, 2018. In addition to SSW television and supercards, the network also has rare footage from Continental Championship Wrestling and other Territory-era wrestling promotions from the Tennessee area.

Roster

Male wrestlers

Female wrestlers

Other on-air personnel

Alumni
Male wrestlers

Female wrestlers

Midget wrestlers

Stables and tag teams

Managers and valets

Commentators and interviewers

Referees

Other personnel

Championships

Current champions

Defunct championships

Kingsport Wrestling Hall of Fame
The Kingsport Wrestling Hall of Fame (also known as the East Tennessee Wrestling Hall of Fame) is an American professional wrestling hall of fame maintained by the Kingsport-based promotion Southern States Wrestling (SWW). It was established in 1999 to honor select personalities in East Tennessee wrestling history. The induction ceremonies are held as part of its annual "Weekend of Champions and Legends Reunion".

See also

List of independent wrestling promotions in the United States

References

Further reading
Valiant, Jimmy. "Woo...Mercy Daddy!" Welcome To My World: The Jimmy Valiant Story. Shawsville, Virginia: Self-Published, 2006.

External links
 
Southern States Wrestling Network
Southern States Wrestling at Cagematch.net

Independent professional wrestling promotions based in Tennessee